Tanganya virus (TGNV) is an enveloped, single-stranded, negative-sense RNA virus, possibly of the genus orthohantavirus in the Bunyavirales order. It is the second indigenous Murinae-associated African hantavirus to be discovered. It has a low sequence similarity to other hantaviruses and serologically distinct from other hantaviruses.  Its host is Crocidura theresae.

References

External links 
 CDC's Hantavirus Technical Information Index page
 Virus Pathogen Database and Analysis Resource (ViPR): Bunyaviridae

Viral diseases
Hantaviridae
Hemorrhagic fevers